The Danish Medical Journal is a monthly peer-reviewed general medical journal published by the Danish Medical Association. It was established in 1954 as the Danish Medical Bulletin, obtaining its current name effective with the January 2012 issue. The editor-in-chief is Anja Pinborg (Hvidovre Hospital). According to the Journal Citation Reports, the journal has a 2015 impact factor of 1.07.

References

External links

General medical journals
Publications established in 1954
Monthly journals
Academic journals published by learned and professional societies
English-language journals
Danish Medical Association